Launch Complex 39B (LC-39B) is the second of Launch Complex 39's three launch pads, located at NASA's Kennedy Space Center in Merritt Island, Florida. The pad, along with Launch Complex 39A, was first designed for the Saturn V launch vehicle, which at the time was the United States' most powerful rocket. Typically used to launch NASA's crewed spaceflight missions since the late 1960s, the pad is currently configured for use by the agency's Space Launch System rocket, a Shuttle-derived launch vehicle which is currently used in the Artemis program and subsequent Moon to Mars campaigns. The pad had also been leased by NASA to aerospace company Northrop Grumman, for use as a launch site for their Shuttle-derived OmegA launch vehicle, for National Security Space Launch flights and commercial launches, before the OmegA program was cancelled.

History

Apollo program
In 1961, President Kennedy proposed to Congress the goal of landing a man on the Moon by the end of the decade. Congressional approval led to the launch of the Apollo program, which required a massive expansion of NASA operations, including an expansion of launch operations from the Cape to adjacent Merritt Island to the north and west.

Launch Complex 39B was designed to handle launches of the Saturn V rocket, the largest and most powerful launch vehicle, which would propel Apollo spacecraft to the Moon. Launch Complex 39B's inaugural launch in May 1969 was also that of the only Saturn V to launch from the pad; SA-505, used to launch the Apollo 10 mission.

After the Apollo 17 mission in 1972, Pad 39B was used for Saturn IB launches. The Mobile Launchers were then modified for the Saturn IB rocket, by adding a "milk-stool" extension platform to the launch pedestal, so that the S-IVB upper stage and Apollo spacecraft swing arms would reach their targets. These were used for three crewed Skylab flights and the Apollo–Soyuz, since the Saturn IB pads 34 and 37 at Cape Canaveral had been decommissioned.

Space Shuttle
With the advent of the Space Shuttle program in the early 1980s, the original structure of the launch pads were remodeled for the needs of the Space Shuttle. Pad 39A hosted all Space Shuttle launches until January 1986, when  would become the first to launch from pad 39B during the ill-fated STS-51-L mission, which ended with the destruction of Challenger and the death of the mission's crew a minute into the flight.

Launch Complex 39B hosted 53 Space Shuttle launches until December 2006, when Discovery launched from the pad for the final time during the STS-116 mission. The program's remaining flights launched from pad 39A. To support the final Shuttle mission to the Hubble Space Telescope STS-125 launched from pad 39A in May 2009, Endeavour was placed on 39B if needed to launch the STS-400 rescue mission.

Constellation program
Launch Complex 39B would subsequently be reconfigured for crewed Ares I launches as part of the Constellation program; the Ares I-X mission launched a prototype Ares I from 39B in October 2009, prior to the program's cancellation the following year.

Artemis program
On November 16, 2022, at 06:47:44 UTC the Space Launch System(SLS) was launched from Complex 39B as part of the Artemis 1 mission.

Current status 
After the Ares I-X test flight in 2009, NASA removed the Fixed Service Structure (FSS) from Pad 39B, returning the location to an Apollo-like "clean pad" design for the first time since 1977. This approach is intended to make the pad available to multiple types of vehicles that will arrive at the pad with service structures on the mobile launcher platform, as opposed to using fixed structures on the pad. The LH2, LOX, and water tanks used for the sound suppression system are the only structures left from the Space Shuttle era.

In 2014, NASA announced that it would make LC-39B available to commercial users during times when it is not needed by the Space Launch System. NASA subsequently agreed to allow Orbital ATK to use LC-39B for their OmegA launch vehicle. However Northrop Grumman, who absorbed Orbital ATK in June 2018, cancelled the development of OmegA in September 2020 before any launches had taken place; SLS will therefore remain the only user of LC-39B for the foreseeable future.

, LC-39B manages the Space Launch System (SLS)'s processing and launch operations, as part of the first phase of a five-phase project, were being completed. The second phase of this project is currently budgeted for $89.2 million.

Launch statistics

See also 

 List of Cape Canaveral and Merritt Island launch sites

References 
Sources

 
 

Citations

External links 

 Launch Pad 39B at NASA
 Cape Canaveral LC39B at Encyclopedia Astronautica
 Pad B modifications for Ares 1-X, level 300 
 Pad B modifications for Ares 1-X, level 275 
 Pad B modifications for Ares 1-X, level 255 
 Pad B modifications for Ares 1-X, level 235 
 The conversion to SLS configuration on Launch Pad 39B – Construction Progress as of June 27, 2014

1969 establishments in Florida
Apollo program
Artemis program
Constellation program
Kennedy Space Center launch sites
Space Shuttle program